The Texaco Hurler of the Year was a hurling award, created in 1958, that honoured the achievements of a hurler of outstanding excellence.  The award was part of the Texaco Sportstars Awards, in which Irish sportspeople from all fields were honoured.

The award was presented annually to the hurler considered to have performed the best over the previous year in the Hurling Championship.  Voting for the award was undertaken by a select group of journalists from television and the print media.  The award itself was 14 inches high.

This award was separate from the All Stars Hurler of the Year, awarded by the GAA since 1995, as part of the GAA All Stars Awards.

The award was discontinued in 2012 after Texaco withdrew their sponsorship.

Recipients

References

1958 establishments in Ireland
Awards established in 1958
Hurling awards
Texaco